Saint John Vianney College Seminary is a Roman Catholic seminary in Westchester, Florida, with a Miami post office address. It was founded in 1959 by Archbishop Coleman Carroll, the first bishop of the Archdiocese of Miami. In 2014, there were 97 students enrolled.

The goal of the institution is to form men for the diocesan priesthood by focusing on the four dimensions of formation: human, spiritual, pastoral, and academic. The Vincentian Fathers opened and ran the school, but in 1975 the Archdiocese of Miami assumed responsibility for the direction of the seminary. The seminary serves men of all the Catholic dioceses in the state of Florida, as well as other seminarians from various dioceses throughout the United States and the world. In accordance with the cultural makeup of Southern Florida, the seminary bills itself as bilingual, allowing seminarians the opportunity to interact, pray and socialize in both Spanish and English.

References

External links
Official website

Roman Catholic Archdiocese of Miami
Catholic seminaries in the United States
Catholic universities and colleges in Florida
Universities and colleges in Miami-Dade County, Florida
Universities and colleges accredited by the Southern Association of Colleges and Schools
Educational institutions established in 1959
1959 establishments in Florida
Westchester, Florida